Erik Glemme (27 May 1905- 20 January 1959) was a Swedish designer and landscape architect.

Biography
Glemme was born in Jönköping, Sweden. He trained at the Royal Institute of Technology in Stockholm from 1927 to 1929. He apprenticed with 
architect Osvald Almqvist (1884–1950). He was employed at the Royal Institute of Technology as an assistant  1943-1947 and as a  teacher  1947–1952. From 1936 to 1956 he was chief architect of the design office of the city of Stockholm Parks Department. 

His work includes Mälarpaviljongen, a landscape park on Norr Mälarstrand, which he designed with landscape architect Holger Blom (1906-1996). Other notable works include the remodelling of  Tegnérlunden and Vasaparken in Stockholm, design of 
Rålambshovsparken in the Marieberg district of Kungsholmen which opened in 1936 and Grynkvarnsparken in Johanneshov designed in the mid-1950s.

References

External links 
 

1905 births
1959 deaths
People from Jönköping
KTH Royal Institute of Technology alumni
Academic staff of the KTH Royal Institute of Technology
Functionalist architects
20th-century Swedish architects
Swedish landscape architects